Metasuchia is a major clade within the superorder Crocodylomorpha. It is split into two main groups, Notosuchia and Neosuchia. Notosuchia is an extinct group that contains primarily small-bodied Cretaceous taxa with heterodont dentition. Neosuchia includes the extant crocodylians and basal taxa, such as peirosaurids and pholidosaurids. It is phylogenetically defined by Sereno et al. (2001) as a clade containing Notosuchus terrestris, Crocodylus niloticus, and all descendants of their common ancestor.

Phylogenetics

 

The phylogeny of basal metasuchians has experienced many revisions in recent years. The phylogeny of notosuchians has been particularly revised, with the construction of Sebecia by Larsson and Sues (2007) to include peirosaurids in the clade. Previously, peirosaurids were placed outside Notosuchia. Larsson and Sues (2007) also suggested that Sebecosuchia (containing the families Baurusuchidae and Sebecidae) was polyphyletic, as Baurusuchus was placed outside Sebecia, which itself was placed outside Notosuchia. However, more recent phylogenetic studies have placed Baurusuchus within Notosuchia once again, although it is still not considered to be a sebecosuchian.

In 2012, a phylogenetic study was done to produce supertrees of Crocodyliformes, including 184 species.  The most parsimonious trees were highly resolved, meaning the phylogenetic relationships found in the analysis were highly likely. As such, below is the consensus tree from the study, focusing on the Metasuchian branch of the tree.

References

External links
Metasuchia in the Paleobiology Database

 
Jurassic crocodylomorphs
Cretaceous crocodylomorphs
Paleogene crocodylomorphs
Neogene crocodylomorphs
Extant Early Jurassic first appearances